Russula adulterina is a species of mushroom in the family Russulaceae.

See also
List of Russula species

adulterina